Edward Andrew "Ned" Brower (born December 15, 1978) is the former drummer/vocalist in the Los Angeles rock quintet Rooney and is also a model and actor. Brower was born in Chapel Hill, North Carolina, U.S., and raised in Seattle, Washington. He has modeled for J. Crew, Abercrombie and Fitch, Tommy Hilfiger, Donna Karen, Ralph Lauren, and The Gap, and also appeared in several films and television shows.  He and his wife Sarah Jane Morris have a son and a daughter.

Discography

Vocals
"Rooney/s/t"
"Rooney/Calling the World"
"Fraus Dots/Sub Pop"
"Ben Lee/Ripe"
"Reliant K/Four Score..."
"One-X"
"Joe Firstman"
"Dawn McCoy"

Drums/Percussion
"Rooney"
"Phantom Planet"
"Grandaddy"
"The Polyphonic Spree"
"Ry Cumming"
"Zooey Deschanel/Sam Shelton"
"Joe Firstman"
"Dawn McCoy"

Filmography

Actor
Big Fat Liar as Rudy
Repli-Kate as Stoner
Not Another Teen Movie as Dude
Princess Diaries as Flypaper

TV Appearances
Dawson's Creek as Elliot Sawyer
The Young Person's Guide To Becoming A Rock Star as Dom

Producer and director
Rooney: Spit and Sweat

References

External links

1978 births
Living people
Male models from North Carolina
20th-century American drummers
American male drummers
21st-century American drummers
20th-century American male musicians
21st-century American male singers
21st-century American singers